Kentucky Route 371 (KY 371) is a  state highway in the U.S. state of Kentucky. The highway connects urban areas of Kenton County.

Route description
KY 371 begins at an intersection with KY 17 (Madison Pike) in the central part of Fort Wright, within Kenton County, where the roadway continues as Eaton Drive. This intersection is at KY 17's crossing of Horse Branch and just north-northeast of that highway's interchange with Interstate 275 (I-275). KY 371 travels to the west-northwest and curves to the southwest. Almost immediately, it leaves Fort Wright and enters the southern part of Fort Mitchell. It curves to the northwest and has a brief concurrency with US 25/US 42/US 127 (Dixie Highway). KY 371 splits off at the Fort Mitchell–Lakeside Park city line. It travels along the city line and enters Lakeside Park proper. It passes a U.S. Post Office of Covington. The highway curves to the west-northwest and re-enters Fort Mitchell. It has an interchange with I-71/I-75 on the Fort Mitchell–Crescent Springs city line. It enters Crescent Springs proper, curves to the north-northeast, and travels on a bridge over some railroad tracks of Norfolk Southern Railway and intersects the northern terminus of KY 2373 (Anderson Road). The highway curves to the west-northwest and passes St. Joseph Elementary School. As soon as it enters Villa Hills, it curves to the northwest. It turns left, to the southwest, onto Amsterdam Road. KY 371 curves to the west and passes River Ridge Elementary School. It curves to the northwest and begins paralleling Dry Creek. It curves to the north-northwest and travels along the western edge of Villa Hills, which is slightly to the east of the Boone County line. It curves to the north-northeast and re-enters Villa Hills proper. It then meets its northern terminus, an intersection with KY 8 (River Road).

Major intersections

See also

References

0371
Transportation in Kenton County, Kentucky